When I Was at Aso-Mountain is an album by jazz drummer Elvin Jones introducing Japanese pianist Takehisa Tanaka recorded in 1990 and released on the Enja label in 1993.

Reception
The Allmusic review called the album "Not an essential recording except for Jones completists".

Track listing
All compositions by Takehisa Tanaka except as indicated
 "Beautiful Love" (Haven Gillespie, Wayne King, Egbert Van Alstyne, Victor Young) - 7:27 
 "I Was Too Young" - 8:25 
 "You Don't Know What Love Is" (Gene de Paul, Don Raye) - 10:14 
 "My Dream Come True, to E.J." - 5:23 
 "Dream Gypsy" (Judith Veevers) - 8:23 
 "When I Was at Aso-Mountain" - 8:12 
 "Soultrane" (Tadd Dameron) - 8:51 
 "Stella by Starlight" (Ned Washington, Victor Young) - 9:31

Personnel
Elvin Jones  - drums 
Sonny Fortune - flute, tenor saxophone 
Takehisa Tanaka - piano
Cecil McBee - bass

References

Elvin Jones albums
1993 albums
Enja Records albums